Nashoba Valley Technical High School is a four-year, public regional vocational high school located on Route 110 in Westford, Massachusetts, United States. Following a $25 million renovation and expansion, its service area covers 14 communities including the seven District towns of Ayer, Chelmsford, Groton, Littleton, Pepperell, Shirley, Townsend and Westford.

Athletics
Members of the Commonwealth Athletic Conference, the Nashoba Tech Vikings compete in Division III.

Fall
Boys' Soccer
Girls' Soccer
Football Cheer
Boys' Cross Country
Girls' Cross Country
Football
Golf
Volleyball
Winter
Boys Basketball (Varsity, JV & Freshman)
Girls Basketball (Varsity & JV)
Ice Hockey
Basketball Cheer
Wrestling
Spring
Baseball (Varsity & JV)
Boys Lacrosse
Girls Lacrosse
Softball (Varsity & JV)
Boys and Girls Track & Field

Technical programs

 Advanced Manufacturing
 Automotive Collision Repair & Refinishing
 Automotive Technology
 Biotechnology
 Carpentry
 Cosmetology
 Culinary Arts
 Dental Assisting
 Design & Visual Communications
 Early Childhood Education & Care
 Electrical Technology
 Engineering Technology
 Health Assisting
 Hospitality Management
 Marketing
 Plumbing & Heating
 Programming & Web Development
 Robotics & Automation
 Television & Media Production/Theater Arts
 Veterinary Assisting

Services provided

 Angell at Nashoba
 Automotive Technology
 Auto Collision Repair & Refinishing
 Cosmo Cuts Salon
 Design & Visual Communication
 Early Learning Center
 Elegant Chef and Bistro
 Lowell Five Bank (ATM in parking lot; Lobby inside school for Students on Thursdays 8:30 am - 11:30 am)
 Programming and Web Design
 Viking Village Mall

References

External links

Schools in Middlesex County, Massachusetts
Public high schools in Massachusetts
Educational institutions established in 1965
1965 establishments in Massachusetts